The 17th Infantry Regiment is a United States Army infantry regiment. An earlier regiment designated the 17th Infantry Regiment was organized on 11 January 1812, but it was consolidated with four other regiments as the 3rd Infantry in the post-war reorganization of the army following the War of 1812, due to the shattering losses it sustained at the River Raisin. The current 17th Infantry was constituted as the 17th Regiment of Infantry on 3 May 1861.

History

Civil War 
The 17th Infantry Regiment served in the Army of the Potomac, in Sykes' Division of the 5th Army Corps. Its badge was a white cross patee.

During the Battle of Fredericksburg, the 17th Infantry suffered heavy losses in the assault on Robert E. Lee's Confederates entrenched behind a stone wall. "For one entire day, (December 14) the men of the 17th lay flat on their faces eighty yards in front of the famous stone wall, behind which the enemy was posted in large numbers and any movement on their part was sure to draw the fire of rebel sharpshooters."

On the second day of the Battle of Gettysburg, the 17th Infantry regiment, commanded by Colonel James Durrell Greene, fought in tough hand-to-hand combat in the Wheatfield. The 17th US Infantry lost 24 KIA and 125 WIA/MIA in this engagement.

Coat of arms
A buffalo, displayed on the a shield below the stone wall, represents the regiment's history in the Korean war. The "Buffalo" nickname was adopted at the suggestion of the 17th Regiment's commander in the Korean War, Col. William W. "Buffalo Bill" Quinn.

The shield is blue, as it is the color of the infantry.

The crest is a sea lion taken from the Spanish Arms of Manila to represent the fighting for that city in 1898.

The five-bastioned fort, shown on the blue shield above and to the right of the stone wall, was the badge of the 5th Army Corps in Cuba in 1898.

The two arrows represent the Indian campaigns the 17th Regiment participated in.

The 17th Infantry Regiment was in the Army of the Potomac during the Civil War in Sykes' Division of the 5th Army Corps, the badge of which was a white Cross pattée, which is embodied in the coat of arms and shown on the blue field above and to the left of the stone wall.

At Fredericksburg the 17th suffered heavy losses in the assault on the famous stone wall, "For one entire day, (December 14) the men of the 17th lay flat on their faces eighty yards in front of the famous stone wall, behind which the enemy was posted in large numbers and any movement on their part was sure to draw the fire of rebel sharpshooters.

Medal of Honor recipients
Spanish–American War
 Private George Berg, Company C
 Private Oscar Brookin, Company C
 Corporal Ulysses G. Buzzard, Company C
 Private Thomas J. Graves, Company C
 First Lieutenant Benjamin F. Hardaway
 Corporal Norman W. Ressler, Company D
 Second Lieutenant Charles DuVal Roberts
 Corporal Warren J. Shepherd, Company D
 Private Bruno Wende, Company C

World War II
 Private First Class Leonard C. Brostrom, Company F
 Private First Class John F. Thorson, Company G

Korean War
 Private Charles H. Barker, Company K
 Captain Raymond Harvey, Company C
 Corporal Einar H. Ingman Jr., Company E
 Private First Class Anthony T. Kahoʻohanohano, Company H
 Corporal William F. Lyell, Company F
 Private First Class Joseph C. Rodriguez, Company F
 First Lieutenant Richard Thomas Shea, Company A

Lineage
 Constituted 3 May 1861 in the Regular Army as the 1st Battalion, 17th Infantry
 Organized 6 July 1861 at Fort Preble, Maine
 Reorganized and redesignated 13 December 1866 as the 17th Infantry
 Consolidated 1 June 1869 with the 44th Infantry, Veteran Reserve Corps (constituted 21 September 1866), and consolidated unit designated as the 17th Infantry
 Assigned 5 July 1918 to the 11th Division
 (2d and 3d Battalions inactivated 1 October 1921 at Fort McIntosh, Texas; activated 24 June 1922 at Fort Crook, Nebraska)
 Relieved 24 March 1923 from assignment to the 11th Division and assigned to the 7th Division
 Relieved 15 August 1927 from assignment to the 7th Division and assigned to the 6th Division
 (2d Battalion inactivated 31 October 1929 at Fort Des Moines, Iowa)
 Relieved 1 October 1933 from assignment to the 6th Division and assigned to the 7th Division (later redesignated as the 7th Infantry Division)
 (2d Battalion activated 1 July 1940 at Camp Ord, California)
 Relieved 1 July 1957 from assignment to the 7th Infantry Division and reorganized as a parent regiment under the Combat Arms Regimental System
 (4th Battalion activated 1984)
 1986 - 1st and 2nd Battalions re-activated at Fort Richardson, AK as part of the 1st Brigade, 6th Infantry Division (Light).
 Withdrawn 16 November 1986 from the Combat Arms Regimental System and reorganized under the United States Army Regimental System
 (4th Battalion inactivated 1993)
 Redesignated 1 October 2005 as the 17th Infantry Regiment
 (4th Battalion activated in Jan 2011 at Fort Bliss TX under 1st Brigade 1st Armored Division)
 4th Battalion de-activated in June 2019 at Fort Bliss TX under 1st Brigade 1st Armored Division (reflagged as 2nd Battalion 37th Armored Regiment)

Campaign participation credit
 Civil War: Peninsula; Manassas; Antietam; Fredericksburg; Chancellorsville; Gettysburg; Wilderness; Spotsylvania; Cold Harbor; Petersburg; Virginia 1862; Virginia 1863
 Indian Wars: Little Big Horn; Pine Ridge; North Dakota 1872
 War with Spain: Santiago
 Philippine Insurrection: Manila; Malolos; San Isidro; Tarlac; Mindanao; Luzon 1899; Luzon 1900
 Mexican Expedition: Mexico 1916-1917
 World War II: Aleutian Islands (with arrowhead); Eastern Mandates (with arrowhead); Leyte; Ryukyus (with arrowhead); Occupation of Korea
 Korean War: UN Defensive; UN Offensive; CCF Intervention; First UN Counteroffensive; CCF Spring Offensive; UN Summer-Fall Offensive; Second Korean Winter; Korea, Summer-Fall 1952; Third Korean Winter; Korea, Summer 1953
 Vietnam: Counteroffensive, Phase VII; Consolidation I; Consolidation II; Cease-Fire
 Armed Forces Expeditions: Panama (with arrowhead)
 Operation Iraqi Freedom: August 2005 to December 2006 Mosul and Baghdad
 Operation Enduring Freedom: July 2009 to July 2010 Kandahar Province, Afghanistan; May 2012 to May 2013
 Operation Freedom's Sentinel: January 2017 to October 2017 Laghman and Nangarhar Provinces, Afghanistan 
 War on Terrorism: Campaigns to be determined

Unit awards

 A Company, 1-17 IN, received the Presidential Unit Citation (Navy) for actions in support of Operation Helmand Spider in Marjah during Operation Enduring Freedom 09-11.

See also
List of United States Regular Army Civil War units
 Second Lieutenant Leighton W. Hazelhurst, was the second US military pilot to be killed in an airplane crash 11 June 1912.
 Philip Egner, bandmaster of the regiment during the Spanish–American War, later composed the West Point fight song, "On, Brave Old Army Team".

References

External links

 17th Infantry Regiment Association's website
 17th Infantry Regiment at unitpages.com
 THE SEVENTEENTH REGIMENT OF INFANTRY. By Captain C. St. J. CHUBB, 17th U. S. Infantry from THE ARMY OF THE UNITED STATES HISTORICAL SKETCHES OF STAFF AND LINE WITH PORTRAITS OF GENERALS-IN-CHIEF, Edited by Theo(philus) F(rancis) Rodenbough Brevet Brigadier General U.S.A. and William L. Haskin, Major, First Artillery, Maynard, Merrill & Co., New York, 1896.

0017
Military units and formations of the United States in the Indian Wars
1861 establishments in the United States
United States Regular Army Civil War units and formations
United States Army units and formations in the Korean War
Military units and formations established in 1861